Doug Walton (9 April 1927 – 18 February 2001) was an Australian cricketer. He played nine first-class matches for Tasmania between 1950 and 1961.

See also
 List of Tasmanian representative cricketers

References

External links
 

1927 births
2001 deaths
Australian cricketers
Tasmania cricketers
Cricketers from Tasmania